Albert York (1928–2009) was an American painter. He lived and worked in New York from 1952 until his death in 2009. He has been represented exclusively by Davis & Langdale Company, Inc. in New York since 1963.

York painted the beauty he saw, once telling an interviewer, "I think we live in a Paradise... This is a Garden of Eden."

Michael Brenson of The New York Times described him as a "reclusive painter of deliberate, dreamlike landscapes, still lifes, and portraits."

References

1928 births
2009 deaths
20th-century American painters
20th-century American male artists
American male painters
21st-century American painters
21st-century American male artists